Northeastern University – London, formerly New College of the Humanities, is a university in London, England. It was founded as a private college by the philosopher A. C. Grayling, who became its first Master. The college, which grants undergraduate and taught master's degrees, is owned by NCH at Northeastern Ltd., a subsidiary of Northeastern University, a private American research university based in Boston, Massachusetts, which acquired the college in February 2019. A year later, in February 2020, NCH at Northeastern Ltd. was granted its own taught degree awarding powers. The college became publicly funded in August 2020. The college specializes in the humanities, social sciences, and master's degrees at the intersection of the humanities and technology.

It was awarded university title and changed its name to "Northeastern University – London" after regulatory approval by the Office for Students in July 2022.

History

Foundation

The foundation of the college was announced in 2011 under the leadership of A. C. Grayling, with education based around an Oxbridge-like tutorial system and fees of £18,000 a year. Initial reports said that it aimed to offer an education to rival that of Oxford and Cambridge, but Grayling said this had been blown out of proportion by press hyperbole. He said he had the idea for the college years ago when he was admissions tutor for St Anne's College, Oxford, and the university was turning down twelve good interviewees for every successful one.

Grayling argued that there was not enough elite university provision in the United Kingdom, leading thousands of British students to study in the United States instead. He told The Independent that the headmaster of Winchester College, an independent secondary school, had said many of his best students failed to get into Oxbridge because of government pressure to increase the number of students from state schools. he also criticised English state examinations, arguing that A-levels do not adequately measure ability.

Grayling said David Willetts, the universities minister, was told of the project in 2010, and appeared enthusiastic. NCH Limited was first named Grayling Hall Limited (after A. C. Grayling and Peter Hall), incorporated in July 2010 and registered at an address in Peckham, south London. The name was changed to New College of the Humanities in February 2011.

Initial "seed capital" of £200,000 for the project was provided, according to British newspaper The Guardian, by the financier Peter Hall. £10 million in private equity funding was subsequently raised to cover costs for two years, with the expectation that NCH would break even by the third. Cavendish Corporate Finance LLP were the corporate financiers hired by NCH Ltd. and raised this £10 million from a range of private investors including a number of prominent individuals from the world of business and finance.

Reception
The college's founding attracted a substantial response in the UK, where most higher education institutions are publicly funded, and a significant amount of adverse publicity. There was an angry reaction from sections of the academic community. Complaints included that NCH had copied the course descriptions of the University of London's international programmes on its website; was offering the same syllabus with a significantly higher price tag; and that the senior academics involved with the project would in fact do very little of the teaching. Academics were also opposed to the college's for-profit structure and high tuition fees. Literary critic Terry Eagleton called the college "odious", arguing that it was taking advantage of a crumbling university system to make money; Grayling responded that Eagleton himself teaches a few weeks a year at the University of Notre Dame in Indiana, USA, a private - though non-profit - university. Lawyer David Allen Green, writing in the New Statesman, described NCH as a "sham" and a "branding exercise with purchased celebrity endorsements and a PR-driven website." Several academics complained in a letter to The Guardian that its creation was a setback for the campaign against the current government's policy of commercializing education, and were joined by 34 of Grayling's former colleagues at Birkbeck, who questioned how much teaching the college's 14 academic partners would actually do. Terence Kealey, then Vice-Chancellor of the University of Buckingham, suggested it was dangerous to have a university funded by private equity, citing the possible collapse in 2011 of Southern Cross private nursing homes.

However, Britain's former prime minister, Tony Blair, endorsed the college; and London's mayor, Boris Johnson, called it the boldest experiment in higher education in the UK since the foundation in 1983 of the University of Buckingham, the UK's first private university; he wrote that it showed the way ahead for academics demoralized by government interference with admissions procedures and "scapegoated for the weaknesses of the schools." The Times argued that higher education has been a closed shop in the UK for too long, that all over the world there are excellent universities run independently of the state, and that in its conception NCH is teaching by example. The Economist wrote that there is a market for the idea because of the increasing number of qualified British students who fail to get into their university of choice, in part because of pressure on the top universities from the Office for Fair Access to increase the number of students from state schools; they added that "a 'toffs’ college' of well-heeled Oxbridge near-misses is a provocative concept." The Harvard historian Niall Ferguson, one of the college's partners, said he had read the criticism of NCH with incredulity: "Anyone who cares about the humanities will be cheering Anthony Grayling." Toby Young argued in The Daily Telegraph that the reaction was part of a left-wing campaign to retain state control over education, involving, he wrote, public sector unions, university lecturers, and the Socialist Workers Party. Simon Jenkins wrote that the country's professors, lecturers and student trade unionists were "united in arms against what they most hate and fear: academic celebrity, student fees, profit and loss, one-to-one tutorials and America."

Grayling responded to the criticism by arguing that NCH was trying to keep humanities teaching alive. He said he felt persecuted by the negative reaction: "My whole record, everything I have written, is turned on its head. Now I am a bastard capitalist. It is really upsetting. ... Education is a public good and we should be spending more on it and it shouldn't be necessary to do this, but standing on the sidelines moaning and wailing is not an option." In a 2012 interview, Grayling also responded to claims that the college was "elitist": "There is nothing wrong with being elite as long as you are not exclusive. You want your surgeon or airline pilot to have been trained at an elite institution."

A dozen protesters heckled Grayling at Foyles bookshop in London on 7 June 2011 during a debate about cuts to arts funding, one of them shouting that he had "no right to speak." A protester let off a smoke bomb, and 100 people were evacuated from the store. Later in the week police removed protesters from a British Humanist Association talk by Richard Dawkins at the Institute of Education.

The warden of New College, Oxford, asked Grayling to change his college's name in 2011 to prevent confusion with the Oxford college. New College, Oxford subsequently trademarked its name. In January 2012, the UK's Intellectual Property Office objected to the college name being registered as a trademark because of possible confusion with New College, Oxford. The college withdrew the application, and later successfully registered their logo as NCH New College of the Humanities.

Development
The first cohort consisted of around 60 students, primarily from private schools; one in five of the college's offers have gone to state-school students. College staff made 130 visits to schools (21 to state schools) to attract applications. They graduated in 2015.

From September 2012 to September 2015, it offered tuition in economics, English, history, law and philosophy and politics and international relations for undergraduate degrees with the University of London International Programme. From 2015 it ran its own degree programmes, validated by Southampton Solent University. Its "Diploma of New College of the Humanities" is earned alongside the various combined BA and BSc degrees by completion of courses in applied ethics, critical reasoning, science literacy and LAUNCH, its professional development programme.

In 2016 NCH announced that it would be offering its first postgraduate qualification from that September, an MA in historical research and public history validated by Swansea University. In 2017 the college launched three additional master's degrees, the MA Economic Policy & Communication, MSc Global Politics, and MA Philosophy.

In 2018, Northeastern University, a private US institution, announced that it planned to acquire the college. The take-over went ahead in 2019, with the college being renamed NCH at Northeastern. The Provost of Northeastern, who had responsibility for overseas campuses, stated that she thought the UK higher education market had opportunities for an innovation in apprenticeships and lifelong learning that could provide future growth for the college, along with an expansion of the curriculum from its liberal arts focus to become more multi-disciplinary.

In February 2020, NCH was awarded renewable taught degree awarding powers for an initial period of six years. In August 2020 these became indefinite after NCH was registered by the Office for Students as a publicly-funded higher education provider, and was registered at a charity. Following the award of indefinite degree awarding powers, NCH announced in 2021 that it would seek university status and permission to use the name Northeastern University – London. This was granted in July 2022.

Campus

The college was initially based in a building called The Registry in Bedford Square, Bloomsbury. As of August 2021, it is based at Devon House, St Katharine Docks, London. Students have access to the NCH Collection at Devon House, Northeastern University's online library resources and the University of London's Senate House Library. It block-books rooms for its first-year students with student accommodation providers.

Academic profile

Courses
The college offers tuition for 56 undergraduate programmes featuring major and minor options in Art History, Creative Writing, Data Science, Economics, English, History, Law, Philosophy, Politics and International Relations, and Psychology as well as a single honours Law LLB, as well as the Philosophy, Politics and Economics BA and Philosophy, Politics & History BA. In addition, its undergraduate students complete courses in applied ethics, critical reasoning, science literacy, and a professional development programme called LAUNCH. The science literacy course includes as its teachers, Richard Dawkins teaching evolution, Steven Pinker lecturing about the brain, and Daniel C Dennett lecturing on consciousness. It also offers master's degrees; MSc Artificial Intelligence with a Human Face, MSc Digital Politics & Sustainability, MA Philosophy & Artificial Intelligence, MA Philosophy, MSc Computer Science.

Teaching
NCH holds a provisional award in the Teaching Excellence Framework, indicating that it "meets rigorous national quality requirements for UK higher education ... but does not yet have sufficient data to be fully assessed."

In the 2017 National Student Survey, NCH achieved student satisfaction scores above the London members of the Russell Group of universities in 26 of the 27 categories.

In May 2014 it was reported that independent research that replicated the annual HEPI academic experience survey showed that the college's academic experience had exceeded the expectations of 63% of its students. This was more than twice the comparative statistic (28%) for Russell Group university students of humanities and social sciences in the HEPI 2014 annual student experience survey. The same research also showed that NCH students experienced 40% more contact time than their peers at Russell Group universities, that they completed twice as many assignments, and that they received feedback on their assignments in person more than twice as often.

Fees

The university's annual fees for home students are £9,250.

Notable staff
Simon Blackburn, professor 
Vernon Bogdanor, professor of politics
Richard Dawkins, professor
A. C. Grayling, Master
Christopher Peacocke, visiting professor
Steven Pinker, visiting professor
Jaya Savige, lecturer in English and head of creative writing
Peter Singer, professor

See also
 BPP University College of Professional Studies
 Education in England
 Higher Education Act 2004
 Regent's University London
 London Interdisciplinary School

References

Further reading
 King, Roger. "Presentation to the all-parliamentary group. Private higher education: private gain or public interest?", House of Lords, 16 June 2009.
 "The growth of private and for-profit higher education providers in the UK", Universities UK, 18 March 2010.
 "Securing a sustainable future for higher education in England" (the Browne report), Independent Review of Higher Education Funding And Student Finance, 12 October 2010.
 "Survey of private and for-profit providers of Higher Education in the UK 2009/10", Higher Education Statistics Agency, 14 April 2011.

External links
 

2011 in London
 
Education in the London Borough of Camden
Educational institutions established in 2011
For-profit universities and colleges in Europe
Higher education colleges in London
Humanities institutes
Liberal arts colleges
Philosophy departments
2011 establishments in England
Private education in the United Kingdom
Northeastern University